"Suicides" is a short story by French writer Guy de Maupassant. It was originally published on 29 August 1880 in the French newspaper Le Gaulois. On 17 April 1883, it was published in Gil Blas under the pseudonym Maufrigneuse, and by other three periodicals, before being republished in the short story collection Les Sœurs Rondoli in 1884.

Plot 
The narrator finds a letter from a man who killed himself officially "without reason". This man of fifty-seven describes his life: thirty years of boredom, always repeated gestures and loneliness. Suffering from stomach pain, he can not eat much "what is still the greatest happiness". That evening he starts a task constantly postponed, to store in his desk correspondence and memories of a lifetime. Moved to tears by all these old stories which come to mind, he looks horrified "the hideous and lonely old age and the coming infirmities". He shoots himself in the head.

Editions 
 Suicides, Maupassant, contes et nouvelles, texte établi et annoté par Louis Forestier, Bibliothèque de la Pléiade, éditions Gallimard, 1974,

References

External links
 
 

Short stories by Guy de Maupassant
1880 short stories
Works originally published in Le Gaulois
Fiction about suicide
Frame stories
Works published under a pseudonym
Short stories about suicide